Silverwater is the tenth album by Australian improvised music trio The Necks first released on the Fish of Milk label in 2009 in Australia and on the ReR label internationally. The album features a single track, titled "Silverwater", performed by Chris Abrahams, Lloyd Swanton and Tony Buck.

Reception
One reviewer stated "There’s an overall mood of passiveness to Silverwater that stands in direct contrast to the more aggressive Chemist. This is The Necks at their most reflective, utilising their key tools of minimalism and repetition to create a gently trance-inducing piece of music. Though occasional bursts of intensity serve to stave off monotony, Silverwater remains a largely subdued affair. That it’s so utterly engaging, and so amenable to repeat listens is testament to the undeniable skill of the musicians involved".

Track listing
 "Silverwater" - 67:15
All compositions by The Necks

Personnel
Chris Abrahams — piano, organ
Lloyd Swanton — bass
Tony Buck — drums, guitar

References

2009 albums
The Necks albums